Occupy San Diego was one of the many occupation protest movements in the United States. Located in San Diego, California, the protest movement initially began in the city's downtown district at the Civic Center. According to authorities, it had "a growing problem with violence and mounting trash". However this assertion was disputed by protesters and eyewitnesses, since Occupy protesters have been actively cleaning the site since October, 2011. It is based on the Occupy Wall Street movement that began in New York City on September 17 and is one of several "Occupy" protest sites in the Southern California, including Occupy Los Angeles.

As of June 2012, Occupy San Diego had continued to engage in organized meetings, events and actions.

Chronology of events
Occupy San Diego started on October 7, when protesters gathered in Children's Park in Downtown San Diego. Plans were made to occupy the Civic Center, but out of respect for the Jewish community's observation of Yon Kippur the occupation was moved to the park for the weekend. Occupy San Diego officially moved to the Civic Center that Sunday evening - October 9. The occupation sustained an encampment in the Plaza for a week, until police issued a warning instructing the protesters to clear out on the evening of Thursday, October 14. On Monday, October 10, a man jumped from the top floor of a parking garage in what was later revealed to have been a suicide. That put to rest some of the speculation that it was linked to violence on behalf of protesters. In response, OSD issued a call out to all local activists to come down to the Civic Center and help defend the camp. Despite their best efforts and overwhelming support, the police stormed in and retook the Plaza, removing all of the tents, food, supplies, and tables and throwing them in the trash. Only one tent remained that Friday morning, guarded by a ring of protesters linking arms and singing "Solidarity Forever".

On November 30, protesters clashed with police as protesters set up a voter registration table. The day before, San Diego police arrested former democratic congressional candidate Ray Lutz for setting up a similar voting registration table, Lutz cited a California Supreme Court ruling which in part states that people are allowed to register voters, even on private property.

Nine protesters were arrested on Dec. 5, 2011, including one who had to be removed from a tree.

On December 12, Occupy San Diego protesters joined with other occupy movements across the west coast in an attempt to shut down the ports in San Diego. About one hundred people showed up to the event, and four people were arrested.

Three protesters were arrested on December 22 while they were in their sleeping bags, a fourth man was arrested for recording the police activity with a camera. This brought the total number of arrests related to the movement in San Diego to 139.

See also

Occupy articles
 List of global Occupy protest locations
 Occupy movement
 Timeline of Occupy Wall Street
 We are the 99%
Other U.S. protests
 2011 United States public employee protests
 2011 Wisconsin protests

Related articles
 Economic inequality
 Grassroots movement
 Income inequality in the United States
 Lobbying

 Plutocracy
 Protest
 Tea Party protests
 Timeline of Occupy Wall Street
 Wealth inequality in the United States

References

Additional sources

External links
 
 

2011 in California
Occupy movement in California
Culture of San Diego
Organizations based in San Diego
2010s in San Diego